Mount Jarvis is an eroded shield volcano in the Wrangell Mountains of eastern Alaska.

When seen from above, Mount Jarvis is distinctly dumbbell-shaped, with two prominent peaks connected by a narrower ridge.
thus qualifying it as an independent peak on the list of thirteeners as well.  The entire summit area including both peaks and the ridge is covered in glacial ice.  The steep, rocky eastern and western faces of Mount Jarvis form headwalls above the cirques of the Jacksina Glacier and Copper Glacier, which flow northward out of the Wrangell Mountains.

Mount Jarvis was named in 1903 by F. C. Schrader, a USGS geologist, for Lt. David H. Jarvis of the U. S. Revenue Cutter Service, who led the Overland Relief Expedition to aid a whaling fleet trapped in Arctic Ocean ice off Point Barrow in 1897–98.


See also

List of mountain peaks of North America
List of mountain peaks of the United States
List of mountain peaks of Alaska
List of volcanoes in the United States

References

External links

 

Shield volcanoes of the United States
Subduction volcanoes
Volcanoes of Alaska
Mountains of Alaska
Landforms of Copper River Census Area, Alaska
Mount Jarvis
Mountains of Unorganized Borough, Alaska
Volcanoes of Unorganized Borough, Alaska
Pleistocene shield volcanoes